Tournament of Champions is an American reality-based cooking television game show on Food Network hosted by Guy Fieri, with Justin Warner and Simon Majumdar as presenters. 16+ chefs who had previously won on other game shows that had aired on Food Network compete in head-to-head, timed, competitions using specified ingredients and random equipment.
The competitions take place in front of a live studio audience. Blind judging is provided by a three judge panel.

Season 1 
Season 1 began on March 3, 2020. Judges for the season included Marcus Samuelsson, Nancy Silverton, Curtis Stone, Rocco Dispirito, Jonathan Waxman,  Ming Tsai and Traci Des Jardins. The champion was Brooke Williamson.

Season 2 
Season 2 began on March 7, 2021. Judges for the season included Marcus Samuelsson, Nancy Silverton, Rocco Dispirito, Jonathan Waxman, Traci Des Jardins, Scott Conant, Alex Guarnaschelli, Cat Cora, Giada De Laurentiis and Ming Tsai. The champion was Maneet Chauhan.

Season 3 
Season 3 began on February 27, 2022. Judges for the season included Nancy Silverton, Rocco Dispirito, Jonathan Waxman, Traci Des Jardins, Scott Conant, Alex Guarnaschelli, Cat Cora, Ming Tsai, Glada De Laurentiis, Lorena Garcia, Eric Ripert, Dominique Crenn and Masaharu Morimoto. The champion was Tiffani Faison.

Season 4 
Season 4 began on February 19, 2023. Judges for the season include Scott Conant, Alex Guarnaschelli, Nancy Silverton, Ming Tsai, and Andrew Zimmern.

West A

West B

East A

East B

Final Four

References

External links

 

Food Network original programming
2020s American cooking television series
2020s American game shows
Cooking competitions in the United States
Reality competition television series